Jason Flynn (born 16 November 1994) is an Irish hurler who plays as a right corner-forward for club side Tommy Larkin's and at inter-county level with the Galway senior hurling team.

Playing career

College

Flynn first came to prominence as a hurler with Mercy College in Woodford. Having played in every grade as a hurler, he was subsequently selected for the college's senior hurling team as well as playing for the amalgamated Mercy Colleges team. In 2013, Flynn won a Connacht Championship medal when Mercy Colleges defeated Presentation College from Athenry by 0-14 to 0-09.

University

As a student at the Galway-Mayo Institute of Technology, Flynn was a regular player on the institute's senior hurling team in the Fitzgibbon Cup.

Club

Flynn joined the Tommy Larkin's club at a young age and played in all grades at juvenile and underage levels before eventually joining the club's top adult team.

Inter-county

Minor and under-21

Flynn first played for Galway as a member of the minor hurling team on 25 July 2010. He made his first appearance in a 1-15 to 2-08 All-Ireland quarter-final defeat of Waterford at Croke Park.

On 4 September 2011, Flynn scored three points from right wing-forward in Galway's 1-21 to 1-12 defeat of Dublin in the All-Ireland final.	

After completing an unsuccessful third season with the Galway minor team, Flynn made his first appearance for the Galway under-21 team on 24 August 2013 in a 1-16 to 0-07 All-Ireland semi-final defeat by Clare.

Senior

Flynn made his first appearance for the Galway senior hurling team in a 0-28 to 1-12 National Hurling League defeat of Dublin on 16 February 2014. Later that season he made his first championship appearance, replacing Cathal Mannion in the 50th minute of a Leinster Championship defeat of Laois.

On 6 September 2015, Flynn scored four points from right corner-forward in Galway's 1-22 to 1-18 defeat by Kilkenny in the All-Ireland final.

On 23 April 2017, Flynn scored 2-01 from play when Galway defeated Tipperary by 3-21 to 0-14 to win the National Hurling League. Later that season he won his first Leinster Championship medal after Galway's 0-29 to 1-17 defeat of Wexford in the final. On 3 September 2017, Flynn came on as a substitute when Galway won their first All-Ireland in 29 years after a 0-26 to 2-17 defeat of Waterford in the final.

On 8 July 2018, Flynn won a second successive Leinster Championship medal following Galway's 1-28 to 3-15 defeat of Kilkenny in the final replay.

Career statistics

Honours

Mercy College
Connacht Colleges Senior Hurling Championship: 2013
Connacht Colleges Senior B Hurling Championship: 2012

Galway
All-Ireland Senior Hurling Championship: 2017 
Leinster Senior Hurling Championship: 2017, 2018
National Hurling League: 2017, 2021
All-Ireland Minor Hurling Championship: 2011

References

1994 births
Living people
Tommy Larkin's hurlers
Galway inter-county hurlers